Jungle Fight Europe, also known as Jungle Fight 7 was a mixed martial arts event held by Jungle Fight on December 17, 2006 at Tivoli Hall in Ljubljana, Slovenia. To date, it is the only Jungle Fight event outside of Brazil.

Results

See also
 2006 in Jungle Fight

References
http://www.sherdog.com/events/JF-7-Jungle-Fight-Europe-4527

2006 in mixed martial arts
Mixed martial arts in Slovenia
Sport in Ljubljana
2006 in Slovenian sport
Jungle Fight events